Shakespeare: The Critical Heritage also known as William Shakespeare: The Critical Heritage  is a six volume work edited by Brian Vickers. Volumes 1 through 3 were published in 1974 and 1975 by Routledge & Kegan Paul.  Vickers' "Critical Heritage" is described as a "...more or less complete collection of criticisms of Shakespeare's works." Additionally, this set was expected to span three centuries by the time Volume 3 was available. Vickers as the editor, wrote digestible introductions to each volume and easy to read headnotes throughout. Volume 6 covers the years of 1774 to 1801, and was published in 1981. The complete set covers viewpoints on Shakespeare's work "from 1623 through to 1801."

References

External links
 

Shakespearean scholarship
British non-fiction books
Literary criticism
Literary theory
1974 non-fiction books
1975 non-fiction books
1981 non-fiction books